Pennsylvania Route 19 may refer to:
Pennsylvania Route 19 (1920s)
U.S. Route 19 in Pennsylvania